The 8th constituency of Ille-et-Vilaine is a French legislative constituency in the Ille-et-Vilaine département, mostly in the city of Rennes. Like the other 576 French constituencies, it elects one MP using the two-round system, with a run-off if no candidate receives over 50% of the vote in the first round.
It was created when the 2010 redistricting of French legislative constituencies added an 8th constituency to Ille-et-Vilaine.

Historic representation

Election results

2022

 
 
 
 
 
 
 
|-
| colspan="8" bgcolor="#E9E9E9"|
|-

2017

2012

References

8